Vestiena Manor is a manor house in the historical region of Vidzeme, in northern Latvia.

History 
Vestiena Manor was first mentioned in historical records in 1452 under the name  Heinrich Tolka Manor at fortification.
Archbishopric of Riga owned territory with all three neighboring manors - Vestiena, Tolka and Deven — from the 14th to the 16th century. Riga's Archbishops vassal E. Tīzenhauzen was managing Vestiena Manor since 1452. Tīzenhauzens family, reigned next 168 years. They were the first of nine noble families that owned the Vestiena manor over the years. The last private owner of Vestiena Manor was Aleksandrs Rušmanis, a Latvian citizen who bought it after 1905 fire and partly restored.

Conversion from military bastion into manor house 
In 18th century  former rural fortification — bastion — was replaced with Vestiena Manor complex, which didn't have any military purpose. Bastion's moats were converted into picturesque ponds. Main manor house was again modernized in the first half of the 19th century with additions of hulls and porch, which gave it appearance of late Classical architecture style.
After the 1905 fire, manor house was rebuilt one more time.
From the 1920s manor house hosted agricultural school, then agricultural mechanization school. Since 1960 it has housed the Vestiena primary school.

See also
List of palaces and manor houses in Latvia

References

External links
  Vestiena Manor

Manor houses in Latvia